Self-Inflicted Aerial Nostalgia is the third album by American indie rock band Guided by Voices. It is considered to be the first album in the group's discography to have their signature sound which was achieved by using low fidelity recording techniques.

It is the only album to feature drummer Bruce Smith.

Background 
After the group's previous releases failed commercially, the band's budget towards production began to shrink considerably. 500 original copies were pressed that were funded by the band, similar to previous releases.

Recording 
The album was recorded at Steve Wilbur's home using an 8-track recorder.

Track listing 
"The Future Is in Eggs" (M. Mitchell/J. Pollard/R. Pollard) – 3:29
"The Great Blake St. Canoe Race" (R. Pollard) – 2:54
"Slopes of Big Ugly" (R. Pollard) – 2:06
"Paper Girl" (R. Pollard) – 2:16
"Navigating Flood Regions" (R. Pollard) – 2:38
"An Earful O' Wax" (R. Pollard) – 4:22
"White Whale" (J. Pollard/R. Pollard) – 2:39
"Trampoline" (R. Pollard) – 2:12
"Short on Posters" (J. Pollard/R. Pollard) – 1:46
"Chief Barrel Belly" (R. Pollard) – 3:16
"Dying to Try This" (R. Pollard) – 1:17
"The Qualifying Remainder" (K. Fennell/M. Mitchell/J. Pollard/R. Pollard) – 2:55
"Liar's Tale" (R. Pollard) – 1:57
"Radio Show (Trust the Wizard)" (J. Pollard/R. Pollard) – 4:01

Personnel
Guided by Voices
 Robert Pollard – vocals, guitar
 Jim Pollard – guitar
 Peyton Eric – drums
 Steve Wilbur – guitar, bass
 Bruce Smith – drums 
Mitch Mitchell – bass
Kevin Fennell – drums

References

Guided by Voices albums
1989 albums